The 1995 EA-Generali Ladies Linz was a women's tennis tournament played on indoor carpet courts at the Intersport Arena in Linz, Austria that was part of Tier III of the 1995 WTA Tour. It was the 9th edition of the tournament was held from 20 February through 26 February 1995. First-seeded Jana Novotná won the singles title.

Finals

Singles

 Jana Novotná defeated  Barbara Rittner 6–7, 6–3, 6–4
 It was Novotná's 3rd title of the year and the 66th of her career.

Doubles

 Meredith McGrath /  Nathalie Tauziat defeated  Iva Majoli /  Petra Schwarz 6–1, 6–2
 It was McGrath's 2nd title of the year and the 20th of her career. It was Tauziat's 1st title of the year and the 12th of her career.

External links
 WTA tournament edition details
 ITF tournament edition details

EA-Generali Ladies Linz
Linz Open
EA-Generali Ladies Linz
EA-Generali Ladies Linz
Generali